() is a widely acclaimed non-fiction book by historian Hubertus Knabe, published in German by Propyläen in 2007. It deals with the legacy of the totalitarian communist dictatorship in East Germany, the lack of punishment for many communist perpetrators, and the whitewashing of the communist regime particularly by the successor of the communist party ("The Left"). Knabe shows how human rights were systematically violated by the communist regime, and attacks the so-called Ostalgie, that is, tendencies to romanticize the life in the communist dictatorship.

Further reading

References

2007 non-fiction books
German non-fiction books
History books about Germany
Books about totalitarianism
Books critical of communism
Ostalgie